John McGregor (2 August 1900 – 9 December 1993) was an English professional footballer who played as a right-back. He played for Gillingham and Crystal Palace between 1930 and 1933.

References

1900 births
1993 deaths
Footballers from Darlington
English footballers
Association football fullbacks
Gillingham F.C. players
Crystal Palace F.C. players
English Football League players